Simon Aspelin and Julian Knowle were the defending champions, but Aspelin chose not to participate, and only Knowle competed that year.
Knowle partnered with Jürgen Melzer, but Marcelo Melo and André Sá defeated them 7–5, 6–7(3–7), [13–11], in the final.

Seeds

Draw

Draw

External links
 Draw

Doubles